Adachia is a genus of flies in the family Dolichopodidae, endemic to Hawaii. It is part of the Eurynogaster complex of genera. The genus is named in honor of Marian Kohn (née Adachi) for her work on Hawaiian dolichopodids.

Species
 Adachia apicenigra (Parent, 1939)
 Adachia hispida (Hardy & Kohn, 1964)
 Adachia nigripedis (Hardy & Kohn, 1964)
 Adachia nudata (Hardy & Kohn, 1964)
 Adachia obscurifacies (Parent, 1939)
 Adachia williamsi (Hardy & Kohn, 1964)

References

Hydrophorinae
Dolichopodidae genera
Insects of Hawaii
Endemic fauna of Hawaii